Bishop William Wallace Duncan House, also known as the DuPre House, is a historic home located at Spartanburg, Spartanburg County, South Carolina.  It was designed by G. L. Norrman and built about 1886.  It is a two-story, asymmetrical, clapboard and cedar shingled dwelling in the Queen Anne style.  It has a high-pitched roof pierced by six chimneys, a decorative mosaic tile front porch landing, a massive wood shingle-clad cylindrical tower, and stained glass windows.  It was moved from its original location at 249 N. Church St. to its present location in November 1999.

It was listed on the National Register of Historic Places in 1976, delisted in 2005, and relisted in 2009.

References

Houses on the National Register of Historic Places in South Carolina
Queen Anne architecture in South Carolina
Houses completed in 1886
Houses in Spartanburg, South Carolina
National Register of Historic Places in Spartanburg, South Carolina